The Long Run may refer to:

 The Long Run (album), a 1979 album by the Eagles
 "The Long Run" (song), a 1979 song by the Eagles from the album
 The Long Run (film), a 2000 film starring Armin Mueller-Stahl and Nthati Moshesh
 The Long Run, a book by firefighter Matthew Long

See also  
 Long-run
 Longrun (disambiguation)
 Long March (disambiguation)
 Long Walk (disambiguation)